Cumro is an unincorporated community in Custer County, Nebraska, in the United States.

History
A post office was established at Cumro in 1885, and remained in operation until it was discontinued in 1943. The community was named after Cumro, Wales.

References

Populated places in Custer County, Nebraska
Unincorporated communities in Nebraska